Columbiana County is a county located in the U.S. state of Ohio. As of the 2020 census, the population was 101,877. The county seat is Lisbon and its largest city is Salem. The county name is derived from the explorer of the Americas, Christopher Columbus.

Columbiana County comprises the Salem, OH Micropolitan Statistical Area, which is also included in the larger Youngstown-Warren, OH-PA Combined Statistical Area. Due to its location, Columbiana County is traditionally considered a part of Appalachian Ohio. While northern communities are more associated with Northeast Ohio, southern communities generally share more in common culturally with Greater Pittsburgh and the Upper Ohio Valley. The largely rural county sits midway between the two urban clusters. Officially considered part of the Youngstown media market, the Steubenville market media stations regularly report in the area as well.

History
The principal historic Native American peoples in the area were the Lenape, Mingo, and Wyandot. The Wyandot had an encampment where the city of Salem now stands. Several important indigenous trails ran through the county, the most important being the Great Trail which ran through the southern parts of the county towards Sandusky. Throughout the second half of the 18th century, starting with Christopher Gist in 1750, American colonists explored the area as the Ohio Company surveyed. George Washington, while engaged in land examinations, camped in the area of present-day East Liverpool in October 1770.

In the 1780s, the Native Americans relinquished control of the area, and the region was surveyed in accordance with the Land Ordinance of 1785. The ensuing Public Land Survey System of the United States started by surveyor Thomas Hutchins on north bank of the Ohio River in present-day East Liverpool resulted in the Seven Ranges, believed to be "the first mathematically designed system and nationally conducted cadastral survey in any modern country."

The first permanent settlement in the area was in 1792 or 1793, by hunter John Quinn, who settled near present-day Calcutta in St. Clair Township. Columbiana County was founded in 1803 and named in honor of Christopher Columbus, combining his surname with the suffix -iana. It was settled early on by Quakers and Scotch-Irish from Pennsylvania, but was later settled primary by Germans. The county was the scene of one of the northernmost action fought during the American Civil War; on July 26, 1863, Confederate raiders under John Morgan were surrounded and captured by Union forces at the Battle of Salineville.

The county was home to the largest pottery industry in the world, in East Liverpool & surrounding communities, which produced more than half of the United States' annual ceramics output. Throughout East Liverpool's ceramics history, there were more than 300 potteries. Other chief industries included iron and brick making, as well as transportation via the Ohio River, Sandy and Beaver Canal, and Pennsylvania Railroad system.

On February 3, 2023, a freight train containing hazardous materials including vinyl chloride derailed in East Palestine. After burning for more than two days, emergency crews conducted a controlled burn of the train's contents, releasing toxic hydrogen chloride and phosgene into the air, and contaminating the Ohio River.

Geography

Adjacent counties
Mahoning County (north)
Lawrence County, Pennsylvania (northeast)
Beaver County, Pennsylvania (east)
Hancock County, West Virginia (southeast)
Jefferson County (south)
Carroll County (southwest)
Stark County (west)

Major highways

Demographics

2000 census
As of the census of 2000, there were 112,075 people, 42,973 households, and 30,682 families residing in the county. The population density was 210 people per square mile (81 per km2). There were 46,083 housing units at an average density of 86 per square mile (33/km2). The racial makeup of the county was 96.43% White, 2.20% Black or African American, 0.18% Native American, 0.23% Asian, 0.02% Pacific Islander, 0.15% from other races, and 0.79% from two or more races. 1.17% of the population were Hispanic or Latino of any race. 24.0% were of German, 12.9% English, 12.8% American, 12.3% Irish and 9.3% Italian ancestry according to Census 2000.

There were 42,973 households, out of which 31.70% had children under the age of 18 living with them, 57.10% were married couples living together, 10.30% had a female householder with no husband present, and 28.60% were non-families. 24.80% of all households were made up of individuals, and 11.90% had someone living alone who was 65 years of age or older. The average household size was 2.52 and the average family size was 3.00.

In the county, the population was spread out, with 24.30% under the age of 18, 7.80% from 18 to 24, 28.60% from 25 to 44, 24.20% from 45 to 64, and 15.00% who were 65 years of age or older. The median age was 38 years. For every 100 females there were 98.80 males. For every 100 females age 18 and over, there were 96.60 males.

The median income for a household in the county was $34,226, and the median income for a family was $40,486. Males had a median income of $32,134 versus $20,331 for females. The per capita income for the county was $16,655. About 9.00% of families and 11.50% of the population were below the poverty line, including 16.20% of those under age 18 and 8.40% of those age 65 or over.

2010 census
As of the 2010 United States Census, there were 107,841 people, 42,683 households, and 29,101 families residing in the county. The racial makeup of the county was 95.5% white, 2.2% black or African American, 0.3% Asian, 0.2% American Indian, 0.5% from other races, and 1.3% from two or more races. Those of Hispanic or Latino origin made up 1.2% of the population. In terms of ancestry, 29.2% were German, 17.7% were Irish, 14.6% were English, 9.1% were Italian, and 7.6% were American.

Of the 42,683 households, 29.8% had children under the age of 18 living with them, 51.4% were married couples living together, 11.5% had a female householder with no husband present, 31.8% were non-families, and 26.8% of all households were made up of individuals. The average household size was 2.43 and the average family size was 2.92. The median age was 42.3 years.

The median income for a household in the county was $39,502 and the median income for a family was $48,948. Males had a median income of $39,614 versus $27,179 for females. The per capita income for the county was $19,635. About 12.1% of families and 16.0% of the population were below the poverty line, including 25.6% of those under age 18 and 6.4% of those age 65 or over.

Politics

Unlike most counties in Northeast Ohio, Columbiana County has been predominantly Republican throughout most of its history. In only eight elections from 1856 to the present has a Democratic Party candidate won the county, the most recent being Bill Clinton in 1996. Despite this, the county was a swing county in the latter half of the 20th century, voting for the national winner in all but two elections from 1952 to 2004. However, like most overwhelmingly-white, non-college educated areas, it has trended heavily Republican in recent elections, with the party's candidates garnering increasing amounts of the vote in each presidential election from 2000 on. This trend was most apparent in 2016 when Donald Trump posted the best showing by a Republican in the county since Herbert Hoover in 1928 with a 41.4 point margin of victory over Hillary Clinton. 

|}

Government

Columbiana County officials

Columbiana County judgeships

Ohio House of Representatives

Ohio State Senate

United States House of Representatives

United States Senate

Education

Colleges and universities
Allegheny Wesleyan College
Kent State University at East Liverpool
Kent State University at Salem

Community, junior, and technical colleges
Columbiana County Career and Technical Center
East Ohio College
New Castle School of Trades

Public school districts

Alliance City School District
Beaver Local School District
Columbiana Exempted Village School District
Crestview Local School District
East Liverpool City School District
East Palestine City School District
Leetonia Exempted Village School District
Lisbon Exempted Village School District
Minerva Local School District
Salem City School District
Southern Local School District
United Local School District
Wellsville Local School District
West Branch Local School District

High schools

Beaver Local High School
Columbiana High School
Crestview High School
David Anderson Junior/Senior High School
East Liverpool Junior/Senior High School
East Palestine High School
Leetonia High School
Salem High School
Southern Local Junior/Senior High School
United High School
Wellsville Junior/Senior High School

Private schools
Heartland Christian School – Columbiana
East Liverpool Christian School – Glenmoor
St. Paul Elementary School – Salem

Communities

Cities
Columbiana
East Liverpool
Salem

Villages

East Palestine
Hanoverton
Leetonia
Lisbon (county seat)
Minerva
New Waterford
Rogers
Salineville
Summitville
Washingtonville
Wellsville

Townships

Butler
Center
Elkrun
Fairfield
Franklin
Hanover
Knox
Liverpool
Madison
Middleton
Perry
Salem
St. Clair
Unity
Washington
Wayne
West
Yellow Creek

https://web.archive.org/web/20160715023447/http://www.ohiotownships.org/township-websites

Census-designated places

 Calcutta
 Damascus
 East Rochester
 Glenmoor
 Homeworth
 La Croft
 Lake Tomahawk
 Negley
 Salem Heights

Unincorporated communities

 Achor
 Bayard
 Cannons Mill
 Chambersburg
 Clarkson 
 Dungannon
 East Carmel
 East Fairfield 
 Elkton 
 Franklin Square
 Fredericktown
 Gavers
 Glasgow
 Guilford 
 Highlandtown
 Kensington
 Lynchburg
 Middleton
 Mill Rock
 Millport
 Moultrie
 New Alexander
 New Garden
 New Middleton
 New Salisbury
 North Georgetown 
 Reading
 Signal
 Teegarden
 Unionville
 Unity
 Valley
 West Point
 Williamsport 
 Winona

Population ranking

The population ranking of the following table is based on the 2020 census of Columbiana County.

* majority of municipality in Columbiana County
** minority of municipality in Columbiana County
† county seat

Notable residents

Harvey Firestone, businessman and founder of the Firestone Tire and Rubber Company
William M. Fogo, Wisconsin legislator and newspaper editor
Mark Hanna, U.S. senator from Ohio; grew up in Lisbon
Ammon Hennacy, Christian anarchist; grew up in Negley
Lou Holtz, former college football coach; grew up in East Liverpool
Robert Justice, early Ohio statesman
William McKinley, 25th president of the United States; grew up in Lisbon
William Ralston, who founded the Bank of California and became for a time the richest man in California; born in Columbiana County
Clement Vallandigham, Copperhead leader; born and lived for several years in Lisbon
Derek Wolfe, former NFL defensive end for the Denver Broncos and Baltimore Ravens; grew up in Negley

See also
National Register of Historic Places listings in Columbiana County, Ohio

References

External links
Official Columbiana County website
Columbiana County Biographies

 
Appalachian Ohio
Counties of Appalachia
Ohio counties on the Ohio River
1803 establishments in Ohio
Populated places established in 1803